Sardar Bahadur Sir Arur Singh Shergill  (1865 – 1926) was Sikh magistrate and civil judge who served as the manager of Darbar Sahib and the 10th Jathedar of the Akal Takht, as a sarbarah appointed by the British Raj from 1907 to 1920.

Early life and career
Arur Singh Shergill was born in Naushehra Nangli, Amritsar, British India to a Sikh family of Shergill clan in 1865. His father Deputy Inspector Harnam Singh died when he was four years of age. Being a minor, his property was brought under the Court of Wards to be administered by Gulab Singh Bhagowalia and Ajit Singh Attari till 1885. He was educated at the Government High School in Amritsar.

In 1888, Shergill became an honorary magistrate of second class with powers over 133 villages of Kathu Nangal police station. Later he became a magistrate of first class in 1907 for the same district. He was also the honorary civil judge in Amritsar.

Jathedar of the Akal Takht
Shergill was appointed a sarbrah by British deputy commissioner of Amritsar to manage Darbar Sahib and the Akal Takht in 1905. In the first week of May 1905, Shergill removed idol from the Darbar Sahib and prohibited the entry of Brahmins within the premises.

Subsequent to the Jallianwala Bagh massacre on 13 April 1919, Shergill honored Reginald Dyer, the general who ordered the massacre. He thanked Dyer for their protection of the Darbar Sahib complex. Shergill's maternal grandson Simranjit Singh Mann, the president of Shiromani Akali Dal (Amritsar) apologised in 2001 for the honour given to Dyer by his maternal grandfather. Mann also justified Shergill's decision in 2022 by saying, "he did it to save the Golden Temple from bombing on the advice of then principal of Khalsa College G. A. Wathen."

After being pressured by the Sikhs to resign, Shergill gave his resignation on 29 August 1920.

Honours
A Companion (CIE) in 1913 and a Knight Grand Commander (GCIE) in 1921, two classes of the Order of the Indian Empire were awarded to Shergill.

References

Punjabi people
Punjabi-language writers
Sikh writers
Jathedars of Akal Takht
1865 births
1926 deaths
Sardar Bahadurs